The Azmat-class stealth fast attack craft (military designation: Azmat FAC(M)) is a class of missile-bearing fast attack craft, currently in service with the Pakistan Navy. The Azmat class is based on the Chinese design, Houjian class. The Pakistani Azmat class is the modernized version according to the requirements of Pakistan navy.

The project was jointly designed and constructed in Pakistan and China after a partnership agreement was signed between two Chinese contractors, China State Shipbuilding Corporation and the Xingang Shipyard and the Pakistan-based KSEW Ltd. The Azmat-class ships are intended for deployment in maritime patrol, anti-surface warfare, anti-air warfare, search-and-rescue (SAR) and anti-piracy missions.

List of vessels

References

Missile boat classes
China–Pakistan military relations
Ships built in Pakistan
Ships built in China